Qacar Zeyid -- also referred to as Qəcərzeyid, Qəcər Zeyd, Kadzhar, Kadzhar Zeid, and Zeyt --  is a village and municipality in the Quba Rayon of Azerbaijan.  It has a population of 781.

References 

Populated places in Quba District (Azerbaijan)